Nasser Zahedi (born 20 May 1961, in Qom, Imperial State of Iran) is a German Doctor of Medicine, author, translator, and photographer from Iran.

References

1961 births
Living people
German photographers
German male writers
People from Qom
Iranian emigrants to Germany
German translators